Peru station was a railway station in Peru, Indiana.

Amtrak service to the Peru began on September 24, 1974 after the James Whitcomb Riley was detoured onto the Chesapeake and Ohio Railway tracks through Indiana. Service to Peru ended after April 27, 1986 when the Cardinal (renamed from the James Whitcomb Riley in 1977) was rerouted onto the former Baltimore and Ohio Railroad in Ohio and Indiana, and the former Monon Railroad (alongside the Hoosier State train) north-west of Indianapolis.

The station building was subsequently torn down and the tracks were removed to allow for construction of the Peru Riverwalk.

References

External links
Peru Amtrak Station (USA Rail Guide — Train Web)

Railway stations in the United States opened in 1974
Railway stations closed in 1986
Former Amtrak stations in Indiana
Transportation buildings and structures in Miami County, Indiana
Demolished railway stations in the United States